The Karlstrup Windmill is a post mill in the Sorgenfri neighborhood of Kongens Lyngby in Denmark.

Description
The three-storey post mill sits on a stump that allows the mill to rotate and capture wind. The windmill then power a millstone to produce flour.

History
The Karlstrup Windmill was built in 1662 in Karlstrup, a village southwest of Copenhagen, in the Solrød Municipality and was rebuilt in 1793. The windmill primarily produced flour but was modified in 1798 to also peel barley. The mill had a local monopoly on milling flour within a two-mile radius of the mill until 1849, when the first Danish constitution abolished monopolies. In 1921, the windmill was acquired by the Frilandsmuseet and moved to the open-air museum's grounds a year later.

In popular culture
In 2011, the Karlstrup Windmill appeared on the eighth episode of The Amazing Race 19.

See also

List of windmills in Denmark

References

Post mills in Denmark
Windmills in Denmark
Relocated buildings and structures in Denmark
Buildings and structures in Lyngby-Taarbæk Municipality